The 2013 Butler Bulldogs women's soccer team represented Butler University in the 2013 NCAA Division I women's soccer season. Their head coaches were Tari St. John, serving her 7th year, and Rob Alman, serving his 1st year. The Bulldogs played their home games at the Butler Bowl.  This was the first year that Butler competed in the Big East Conference, as they moved from the Atlantic 10 Conference following the 2012–13 academic year.

Roster
As of August 26, 2013

References

Butler
Butler Bulldogs women's soccer seasons
Butler women's soccer